Tunumiit oraasiat or East Greenlandic (East Greenlandic: , Kalaallisut: tunumiusut) is a variety of Greenlandic spoken in eastern Greenland by the Tunumiit. It is generally considered a divergent dialect of Greenlandic, but verges on being a distinct language. The largest town where it is the primary language is Tasiilaq on Ammassalik Island, with the island's name being derived from the West Greenlandic name of the town.

Notes

Greenlandic language
Inuit languages
Languages of Greenland
Indigenous languages of the North American Arctic